Miquel Parera Pizà (born 18 May 1996) is a Spanish professional footballer who plays for Racing de Santander as a goalkeeper.

Club career
Parera was born in Manacor, Mallorca, Balearic Islands, and joined RCD Mallorca's youth setup in 2007, from CE Manacor. He made his senior debut with the reserves on 31 August 2014, starting in a 1–2 Segunda División B away loss against CD Alcoyano.

Parera would feature sparingly for the B-side in the following campaigns, and renewed his contract on 3 April 2017. He was promoted to the main squad ahead of the 2017–18 campaign in the third division, and acted as a backup to Manolo Reina as his side returned to Segunda División at first attempt.

Parera made his professional debut on 11 September 2018, starting in a 1–0 home win against Real Oviedo for the season's Copa del Rey. On 25 October, he renewed his contract until 2021.

Parera made his debut in the second division on 4 November 2018, playing the full 90 minutes in a 1–1 draw at Real Oviedo. Still a backup to Reina, he featured in seven matches during the season as the club achieved a second consecutive promotion.

Parera made his La Liga debut on 19 July 2020, starting in a 2–2 away draw against CA Osasuna as his side was already relegated. On 15 June 2021, Parera moved to third division side Racing Santander on a one-year deal.

Career statistics

Club

References

External links

1996 births
Living people
Sportspeople from Manacor
Spanish footballers
Footballers from Mallorca
Association football goalkeepers
La Liga players
Segunda División players
Primera Federación players
Segunda División B players
Tercera División players
RCD Mallorca B players
RCD Mallorca players
Racing de Santander players